KF Vushtrria is a football club based in Vushtrri, Kosovo. The club was founded in 1922, and currently play their home games at the Ferki Aliu Stadium in the city of Vushtrri which has a capacity of 6,000 supporters. The most notable players to have played for the club and have been former Albania internationals Armend Dallku, Ahmed Januzi and Kosovo international Milot Rashica, Besnik Kollari.

History

KF Vushtrria is the oldest football club in Kosovo. It was founded in 1922 and it has been competing domestically in Kosovo ever since. Throughout the years after World War II, Vushtrri became one of the most renowned football clubs in Kosovo due to producing some of Kosovos’ best young talents. Many of these players were transferred to other Kosovar clubs such as Prishtina and Trepça due to them playing in former Yugoslav First League.

After the Kosovo War, the citizens & supporters returned to its stadium stands. Although regularly fighting relegation throughout the seasons during the 2000s, the “Ferki Aliu Stadium” had strong fan attendance. The clubs’ ultras group “Forca” gained a nationwide generalisation during that period due to many opposing teams supporters being the subject of verbal and physical abuse when they would travel and watch their team play in the city of Vushtrri. Due to this, the club was constantly fined and deducted points and became one of Kosovos most hated teams and fiercest cities to play away at.

In 2012 the club was purchased by local steel galvanising plant, Llamkos GalvaSteel. When the club was taken over by Llamkos GalvaSteel and the Core Group, there were immediate investments made which resulted in the club winning their 2013–14 league title, which was the first in its history. Llamkos GalvaSteel then distanced itself from the club as did the club's owner Jeton Sadiku, leaving the financing and management in the hands of the Vushtrri municipality.

Players

Current squad

Historical list of coaches

 Ismet Munishi (Mar 2013 - Oct 2014)
 Bekim Shotani (Jul 2015 - 7 Dec 2015)
 Isa Sadriu (7 Dec 2015 - 12 Jan 2016)
 Rizvan Jetullahu (12 Jan 2016 - Apr 2016)
 Bekim Shotani (13 Apr 2016 - May 2016)
 Isa Sadriu (28 Jun 2017 - 2 Jun 2018)
 Samuel Nikaj (14 Jun 2018  - 23 Jun 2019)
 Bekim Shotani (30 Jun 2019 - Sep 2019)
 Antonio Toma (8 Sep 2019  - 22 Oct 2019)
 Fitim Llapashtica (22 Oct 2019 - )

Notes

References

 
Vučitrn
Association football clubs established in 1922
Sport in Vushtrri